Ebbe Rørdam (10 January 1925 – 16 March 1945) was a member of the Danish resistance killed by the German occupying power.

Biography 
Rørdam was born 10 January 1925 in Hvilsager as the second child of parish priest Johannes Holger Rørdam and wife Kirsten née Hansen and was baptized by his father in Hvilsager Church the Sunday before Lent that year. In 1939 on the first Sunday after Easter, Rørdam was confined by his father in the Torkilstrup church. On 16 March 1945, Rørdam died in connection with the sabotage of an ammunition train.

After his death 
After the liberation, Rørdam's remains were exhumed at Ryvangen and transferred to the Department of Forensic Medicine of the University of Copenhagen. On 14 June 1945, an inquest at the University found that he died from a skull fracture. On 20 July, his father lead a memorial service for him in Grundtvig's Church On 29 August, Rørdam and 105 other victims of the occupation were given a state funeral in the memorial park founded at the execution and burial site in Ryvangen where his remains had been recovered. Bishop Hans Fuglsang-Damgaard led the service with participation from the royal family, the government and representatives of the resistance movement.

References 

1925 births
1945 deaths
Danish civilians killed in World War II
Danish resistance members
Resistance members killed by Nazi Germany